Maraş Grand Mosque is a historical mosque in Kahramanmaraş City, Kahramanmaraş Province, Turkey. The mosque is at the south of Kahramanmaraş Castle and to the north west of the covered market. 
It was built by Süleyman of Dulkadirids who reigned between 1442 and 1454. In 1501-1502 it was renewed by his son Bozkurt of Dulkadir. 
The mosque is a wooden-roof mosque. Unlike most other mosques the minaret of the mosque was not built as a part of the mosque. It is in the yard and was decorated with ceramic plates.

See also
 List of Turkish Grand Mosques

References

Buildings and structures in Kahramanmaraş
Mosques in Turkey
15th-century mosques
Dulkadirids
History of Kahramanmaraş
Grand mosques